"I Just Can't Say No to You" is a song by American singer-songwriter Parker McGee. It was released as a single in 1976 from his sole self-titled album, Parker McGee.

The song reached number 42 on the Billboard Hot 100 and peaked at number 7 on the Adult Contemporary chart in early 1977.

Cover versions
"I Just Can't Say No to You" has been covered by the following:
Jackie DeShannon from the 1977 album You're the Only Dancer.
Michael Johnson as the B-side to "This Night Won't Last Forever", and from the 1979 album Dialogue.
Margo Smith from the 1980 album Diamonds & Chills.
Moe Bandy as a single which reached No. 21 on the Country chart, from the 1988 album No Regrets.

Chart performance

References

1976 songs
1976 singles
Songs written by Parker McGee
American soft rock songs
Song recordings produced by Kyle Lehning
Big Tree Records singles